The men's high jump at the 2022 World Athletics Championships was held at the Hayward Field in Eugene, Oregon, on 15 and 18 July.

Summary

Eleven athletes cleared 2.28m, so it turned out a clean round to 2.25m was good enough to get 13 (12 plus ties) into the final.  In the final ten survived 2.27m, only five got over 2.30m. Defending champion, co-Olympic Champion Mutaz Essa Barshim, Woo Sang-hyeok and Shelby McEwen all had perfect rounds going and thus were tied for first place. Co-Olympic Champion Gianmarco Tamberi cleared on his last attempt to hold on to the fifth spot.  At 2.33m Woo missed, Andriy Protsenko made it on his first attempt to take the lead, for the 30 seconds it took for Barshim to be called and also clear, with a clean round, to take the lead back. Tamberi cleared on his second attempt to take over third place while McEwen missed twice and saved his last remaining attempt for the next height.  At 2.35m, Woo and Protsenko missed, Barshim remained perfect and McEwen bowed out. Woo made it on his second attempt to keep the competition alive, Protsenko and Tamberi missed. Protsenko elected to save his final attempt for 2.37m, Tamberi missed and was out. At , Woo then Protsenko missed, leaving Protsenko with the bronze. Barshim cleared it again leaving Woo no other choices but to pass. And after Woo missed at 2.39m made the calculated gamble. If Woo made his final attempt, Barshim could lose gold at the last second, or at least be pressured to make one of the top 10 jumps in history (which he has done on 5 occasions). Woo failed, taking silver. A perfect round and gold already in hand, Barshim took one attempt at 2.42m and called it a day.

Preview
Preview

Records
Before the competition records were as follows:

Qualification standard
The standard to automatically qualify for entry was 2.33 m, with a qualification period from 28 June 2021 to 26 June 2022, for a quota number of 32 athletes.

Only 6 high jumpers reached 2.33 m during the qualification period (2021-2022), indoors and outdoors (Barshim, Tamberi, Woo, Starc, Harrison and McEwen). 2 jumpers were selected by finishing position at designated competitions (Ferreira and Kerr, area champions). The final entries were made by completing to 32 athletes, including the defending world champion Mutaz Essa Barshim (wild card), and the Diamond League winner Gianmarco Tamberi, (wild card), both defending Olympic Champions in Tokyo 2020.

Neither the 2022 world leader, Ilya Ivanyuk, nor Russian or Belarusian athletes, as Maksim Nedasekau, 3rd in Ranking, were admitted, even under ANA status.

Naoto Tobe, qualified by ranking, withdrawn.
Even if regularly entered, Brandon Starc preferred to focus on the following 2022 Commonwealth Games.

World athletics ranking 
Before the 2022 World Championships:

 Gianmarco Tamberi ITA 1404 points, High Jump [incl. High Jump indoor]
 Woo Sang-hyeok KOR 1376 pts High Jump [High Jump ind.]
 Maksim Nedasekau BLR 1354 pts High Jump
 Django Lovett CAN 1334 pts High Jump
 Ilya Ivanyuk ANA 1318 pts High Jump
 JuVaughn Harrison USA 1305 pts High Jump [High Jump ind.]
 Mikhail Akimenko RUS 1295 pts High Jump [High Jump ind.]
 Andriy Protsenko UKR 1294 pts High Jump
 Hamish Kerr NZL 1292 pts High Jump [High Jump ind.]
 Brandon Starc AUS 1291 pts High Jump
 Shelby McEwen USA 1270 pts High Jump
 Norbert Kobielski POL 1261 pts High Jump [High Jump ind.]

Schedule
The event schedule, in local time (UTC-7), is as follows:

Results

Qualification taking the L
Qualification: 2.30 m (Q) or at least 12 best performers (q).
Only 29 athletes are entered on the quota number of 32: Brandon Starc and defending South American champion Fernando Ferreira did not finally enter.

Final
The final started on 18 July at 17:45.RESULTS High Jump Men - Final

References

High jump
High jump at the World Athletics Championships